Santa Rita High School is located in Groves Lincoln Park, Tucson, Arizona. The school was established in 1969. It was named after the Santa Rita Mountains, one of the mountain ranges surrounding the Tucson valley. The campus has three main two-story classroom buildings where most classes are held. The school educates about 950 students from grades 9 to 12. Graduating classes usually consist of 300 students.

In the 1984–85 school year, it was honored as a Blue Ribbon school.

Campus

Most classes are held in the one, two, and three hundred buildings with a few such as Band, Choir, Adv. Culinary Arts, Welding, Construction, Automotive Technology, and Drama held in other buildings. Vocational programs are held in the northernmost building of the campus.

Recently Santa Rita has expanded by adding a secondary, more current gymnasium to their campus.

Athletics

Football

In the summer of 2007 it was announced that Santa Rita would be hiring a new football coach, Jeff Scurran. After a 0-10 2006–2007 season, the Eagles underwent a radical transformation to an 11-2 team, falling one game short of the championship game. For the next two seasons, the Eagles went to the title game but came up short. The 2008-2009 team had a record of 12-2 and lost to the defending champions from Notre Dame Preparatory High School by a score of 30–26. The 2009-2010 team returned to the state championship with a record of 11–3, but they lost in the coach's final game at the school as Cactus High School would shut them out 14–0.

Basketball
In 98’-‘99 school year, the Eagles led by Coach Ferguson, defeated Thunderbird High for the 4A Boys state title.

In 2009–2010 school year the Eagles won the state championship for 4A-II boys' basketball.

References

External links
Santa Rita High School
Tucson Unified School District

Educational institutions established in 1969
Public high schools in Arizona
Schools in Tucson, Arizona
1969 establishments in Arizona